Vowinckel may refer to:

People with the surname
Antje Vowinckel (born 1964), German sound artist, radio artist, and musician
Ernst Vowinckel (1828–1904), German businessman and member of the Reichstag
Hans-August Vowinckel (1906–1941), German writer
Helga Vowinckel (1930–1986), German nuclear power opponent

Places
Vowinckel, Pennsylvania, a census-designated place in Clarion County, Pennsylvania, USA

See also
Vohwinkel (disambiguation)

German-language surnames